is a railway station on the Echigo Tokimeki Railway Nihonkai Hisui Line in the city of Jōetsu, Niigata, Japan, operated by the third-sector railway operator Echigo Tokimeki Railway.

Lines

Station layout
The station consists of two opposed ground-level side platforms, connected by a level crossing. The station is unattended.

Platforms

Adjacent stations

History
The station opened on 1 July 1947. With the privatization of Japanese National Railways (JNR) on 1 April 1987, the station came under the control of JR West. From this date, Arimagawa Station was transferred to the ownership of the third-sector operating company Echigo Tokimeki Railway.

Passenger statistics
In fiscal 2017, the station was used by an average of 15 passengers daily (boarding passengers only).

Surrounding area
Arimagawa fishing port

See also
 List of railway stations in Japan

References

External links

Train timetables 

Railway stations in Niigata Prefecture
Railway stations in Japan opened in 1947
Stations of Echigo Tokimeki Railway
Jōetsu, Niigata